Oleg Savchenko may refer to:

Oleg Savchenko (politician, born 1948), Russian politician
Oleg Savchenko (politician, born 1966), Russian politician
  (born 1989), Belarusian musician